Charles Taylor (1840–1908) was an English Christian Hebraist.

Life

Taylor was born on 27 May 1840 in London. He was educated at King's College School, and St. John's College, Cambridge, where graduated BA as 9th wrangler in 1862 and became a fellow of his college in 1864. He became Master of St John's in 1881. In 1874 he published an edition of Coheleth; in 1877 Sayings of the Jewish Fathers, an elaborate edition of the Pirḳe Abot (2 ed., 1897); and in 1899 a valuable appendix giving a list of manuscripts.

Taylor discovered the Jewish source of the Didache in his Teaching of the Twelve Apostles, 1886, and published also an Essay on the Theology of the Didache, 1889.

Taylor took a great interest in Solomon Schechter's work in Cairo, and the genizah fragments presented to the University of Cambridge are known as the Taylor-Schechter Collection. He was joint editor with Schechter of The Wisdom of Ben Sira, 1899. He published separately Cairo Genizah Palimpsests, 1900.

He wrote also several works on geometry and participated in the creation and running of the journal Messenger of Mathematics.

On 19 October 1907 he married Margaret Sophia Dillon, daughter of the Hon. Conrad Dillon.

He died in Nuremberg on 12 August 1908 and is buried in the Parish of the Ascension Burial Ground in Cambridge.

References

Footnotes

Bibliography
Who was Who: Vol. 1: 1897–1915. London: A. & C. Black

External links
 
Charles Taylor in The Jewish Encyclopedia
 

1840 births
1908 deaths
Christian Hebraists
People educated at King's College School, London
Alumni of St John's College, Cambridge
Fellows of St John's College, Cambridge
Masters of St John's College, Cambridge
Academic journal editors
Vice-Chancellors of the University of Cambridge